Leung Sing Yiu (born 15 November 1995) is a Hong Kong professional footballer who currently plays for Hong Kong Premier League club Sham Shui Po.

Honours

Club
Tai Po
 Hong Kong Premier League: 2018–19
 Hong Kong Sapling Cup: 2016–17

References

External links

1995 births
Living people
Hong Kong footballers
Association football defenders
Tai Po FC players
Sham Shui Po SA players
Hong Kong Premier League players
Hong Kong First Division League players